Hollie Natashia Dunaway (born October 18, 1984) is an American former professional boxer who competed from 2003 to 2013. She held the IBA female mini flyweight title from 2004 to 2006 and challenged for 3 major female world titles.

Career
Dunaway had no amateur boxing background before she turned professional. She made her boxing debut on February 4, 2003, at The New Daisy Theatre in Memphis, Tennessee, where she lost to Melissa Shaffer. She lost two of her first three professional bouts, but went on to win 13 of her next 14.

On April 16, 2005, in Magdeburg, Germany, Regina Halmich won a ten-round unanimous decision over Dunaway, defending her Women's International Boxing Federation flyweight title. As of July 2005, Dunaway's professional boxing record was 14-4-0 (9 KOs). On February 16, 2006, she successfully defended her Women's International Boxing Association (WIBA) mini flyweight title against Shaffer in Kansas City, Missouri, winning in a unanimous decision (100-90, 99-91, 99-91). This result made Dunaway's record 15-5-0 (9 KOs). On September 21, 2006, she defended her WIBA mini flyweight world title for the second time against Dee Hamaguchi, knocking her down twice in the first round and winning the match by seventh-round stoppage. On November 25, 2006, she went to Budapest and beat world champion Krisztina Belinszky (19-4-2) for two world titles. On March 15, 2007, at the Ameristar Casino in St. Louis, Dunaway beat Wendy Rodriguez (17-2-3) in an eight-round unanimous decision. The judges' scores were 80-72, 80-72, and 79-73. On August 3, 2007, she beat Mary Ortega (28-3-1) in a unanimous decision by the judges.

On January 11, 2008, Dunaway moved up to flyweight and captured the North American Boxing Federation flyweight title by beating Sharon Gaines in a unanimous decision (she later fought Gaines to a draw on September 27 of the same year). On June 13, she lost to Rodriguez while fighting for the vacant International Boxing Association mini flyweight title. On February 28, 2009, she lost in South Korea against Hi Jyun Park for the International Female Boxers Association mini flyweight title. On August 22, she beat Mayela Perez. In 2010, she won against Chantel Cordova on January 28. She lost to Ana Maria Torres on November 6, fighting for the WBC super flyweight title. In 2011, 2012, and 2013, she fought only once per year. She lost to Katia Gutiérrez on April 16, 2011, in a fight for the vacant International Boxing Federation mini flyweight title. A fight against Becky Garcia on April 26, 2012, ended in no contest. She lost to Cordova on November 15, 2013.

Dunaway has fought in four weight divisions.

Professional boxing record

References

External links
 
 Dunaway's website
 Hollie Dunaway's camp comment on her ranking in the Kocosports 'Hot 100'

1984 births
Living people
People from Van Buren, Arkansas
American women boxers
World flyweight boxing champions
21st-century American women